Ibraime Cassamá (born 24 January 1986) is a Bissau-Guinean footballer who plays for Real SC.

International career

International goals
Scores and results list Guinea-Bissau's goal tally first.

References

External links 
 
 

1986 births
Living people
Citizens of Guinea-Bissau through descent
Bissau-Guinean footballers
Guinea-Bissau international footballers
Portuguese footballers
Footballers from Lisbon
Portuguese sportspeople of Bissau-Guinean descent
Académica Petróleos do Lobito players
G.D. Interclube players
C.D. Cova da Piedade players
F.C. Barreirense players
Sertanense F.C. players
Eléctrico F.C. players
S.C. Praiense players
S.U. Sintrense players
Real S.C. players
Association football midfielders
Bissau-Guinean expatriate footballers
Expatriate footballers in Angola
Portuguese expatriate sportspeople in Angola